Paul C. Shomshor, Jr. (born April 10, 1967) is a former Iowa State Representative from the 100th District. He served in the Iowa House of Representatives from 2003, when he was elected in a special election, until 2011.  He received his BA and MA from Baylor University.

During his last term in the Iowa House, Shomshor served on the Agriculture, Commerce, and (until November 9, 2009) State Government committees. He also served as the chair of the Ways and Means Committee and as a member of the Health and Human Services Appropriations Subcommittee. His prior political experience includes serving on the Council Bluffs City Council from 1997–2001 and running for the United States House of Representatives in 2002.

Electoral history
In 2002, Shomshor ran for Iowa's 5th congressional district, following the 2002 redistricting and Republican Greg Ganske's decision to leave the House and run for the United States Senate. He lost the election to Republican opponent and then-State Senator Steve King.  He won election to the Iowa House in an August 5, 2003 special election for the vacancy in the 100th District left when Republican Brad Hansen resigned to attend law school.  He won the election, defeating Republican opponent Steve Cates.  Shomshor left the house in 2011 after losing re-election in 2010 to Republican Mark Brandenburg.

*incumbent

References

External links

Representative Paul Shomshor official Iowa General Assembly site
Paul Shomshor State Representative official constituency site
 
Iowa Democratic Party Fifth District

Democratic Party members of the Iowa House of Representatives
1967 births
Living people
Baylor University alumni
Iowa city council members
Politicians from Council Bluffs, Iowa